Friedrich Köck (5 February 1898 – 1982) was an Austrian footballer. He played in six matches for the Austria national football team from 1916 to 1922.

References

External links
 

1898 births
1982 deaths
Austrian footballers
Austria international footballers
Place of birth missing
Association footballers not categorized by position